William Edward Curry Jr. (born December 17, 1951 in Hartford, Connecticut) is an American lawyer and politician who has been a two-time Democratic nominee for Governor of Connecticut and a White House advisor in the administration of Bill Clinton.

Education and early political life
Curry was educated at St. Justin's School in Hartford and Northwest Catholic High School in West Hartford. He received his undergraduate degree from Georgetown University and a J.D. degree from the University of Connecticut School of Law. In 1978, at the age of 26, he was elected state senator from a district that included Farmington, Connecticut. Curry served two terms and then faced fellow state senator Nancy Johnson, a moderate Republican from New Britain in 1982 for the open seat formerly held by Toby Moffett in what was then the Sixth Congressional District. Johnson defeated Curry.

During the ensuing eight years, Curry practiced law and worked in public policy positions in Washington, D.C. He was head of Freeze Voter, a nuclear freeze group. In 1990, Curry was elected state comptroller after a convention fight, winning statewide election against the Republican nominee, Joel Schiavone. He served one term.

Gubernatorial bids and the White House
In 1994, Curry defeated John Larson for the Democratic gubernatorial nomination. The field in the general election included former Republican U.S. Representative John G. Rowland, Eunice Groark (lieutenant governor under the departing officeholder, Gov. Lowell P. Weicker Jr.), Curry and Tom Scott, a former Republican legislator from Milford, Connecticut and talk show host running a conservative, anti-tax independent candidacy. Rowland won that election by three points.

After the election, Curry accepted a post as Counselor to the President and served as domestic strategist in the Clinton White House from February 21, 1995 until January 20, 1997. Curry left the Clinton Administration after the 1996 election and served as visiting fellow at the Yale School of Management.

In 2002, Curry again ran against Rowland. While Curry did not face a primary opponent that year, the incumbent enjoyed a fund-raising advantage of roughly 5 to 1. In late September of the campaign, Curry charged that Rowland's administration had awarded contracts based on rigged bidding procedures. Although those charges later proved to be the heart of the scandal that forced Rowland to resign, plead guilty and serve a federal prison sentence, they did not become a significant issue in the campaign. Stressing his accomplishments as Governor, Rowland won his third term by a 12-point margin.

Journalism
Curry is a political columnist for Salon. Curry wrote a political column for the Hartford Courant in Hartford, Connecticut. On August 26, 2007 he endorsed a U.S. withdrawal from Iraq.

References

External links
 Biography from Curry's 2002 campaign

|-

|-

|-

|-

1951 births
Clinton administration personnel
Connecticut Comptrollers
Democratic Party Connecticut state senators
Counselors to the President
Living people
Georgetown University alumni
University of Connecticut School of Law alumni
20th-century American politicians
21st-century American politicians
Candidates in the 1994 United States elections
Candidates in the 2002 United States elections